Some women to have held the title Duchess of Devonshire, as wives of the Duke of Devonshire, include:

 Catherine Cavendish, Duchess of Devonshire (1700–1777), wife of the third duke
 Georgiana Cavendish, Duchess of Devonshire (1757–1806), first wife of the fifth duke
 Elizabeth Cavendish, Duchess of Devonshire (1759–1824), second wife of the fifth duke
 Louisa Cavendish, Duchess of Devonshire (1832–1911), wife of the eighth duke
 Evelyn Cavendish, Duchess of Devonshire (1870–1960), wife of the ninth duke
 Mary Cavendish, Duchess of Devonshire (1895–1988), wife of the tenth duke
 Deborah Cavendish, Duchess of Devonshire (1920–2014), wife of the eleventh duke
 Amanda Cavendish, Duchess of Devonshire (born 1944), wife of the twelfth duke